Admiral Sir Lewis Bayly,  (28 September 1857 – 16 May 1938) was a Royal Navy officer who served during the First World War.

Early life and career
Bayly was born at Woolwich on 28 September 1857. He was a great-grandnephew of Admiral Sir Richard Goodwin Keats. Bayly joined the Royal Navy in 1870. He served in the Third Anglo-Ashanti War in 1873 and against pirates in the Congo Basin in 1875. He later served on the armoured frigate  and in the Anglo-Egyptian War of 1882. Bayly married in 1892 Yves Henrietta Stella, daughter of Henry Annesley Voysey; there was no issue of the marriage.

In July 1902, Bayly became commanding officer of the protected cruiser , serving on the China Station. He was given command of the destroyers of the Home Fleet (1907–1908) with the scout cruiser  as his flagship. On 22 March 1908, Bayly was appointed a naval aide-de-camp to King Edward VII. He was then given a shore command as president of the Royal Naval War College (1908–1911). Before the outbreak of the First World War he was given command successively of the 1st Cruiser Squadron (1911–1912), the 1st Battlecruiser Squadron (1912–13), and the 3rd Battle Squadron (1913–1914).

First World War
During the early months of the First World War, Bayly commanded the 1st Battle Squadron. He was in command of the rescue operation when the dreadnought battleship  was mined and sunk on 27 October 1914.

In December 1914, he was appointed to command the Channel Fleet, flying his flag in the predreadnought battleship . After the exercises, the fleet remained at sea for the night on patrol even though German submarine activity had been reported in the area. With rough sea conditions and the wind increasing, submarine attacks would have been difficult to carry out effectively and so were not thought to be a significant threat. Nonetheless, the predreadnought battleship  was torpedoed and sunk by the German submarine . Bayly was later criticised for not taking proper precautions during the exercises, but was cleared of the charge of negligence.

In January 1915 Bayly was made president of the Royal Naval College, Greenwich. In July 1915 he was made Senior Officer on the Coast of Ireland at Queenstown, Ireland. In 1917 the title became Commander-in-Chief, Coast of Ireland. He held this post until 1919. In this function Bayly was tasked with keeping the approaches to Great Britain safe from U-boat attacks. In 1917, Bayly, promoted to admiral, was given command of a mixed British-American force defending the Western Approaches. He took as his chief-of-staff the American Captain Joel R. P. Pringle. Bayly had a good working relation with his American counterpart, William Sims.

Bayly retired in 1919. He died in London in 1938.

Notes

References

External links
The Dreadnought Project – Lewis Bayly (Royal Navy officer)

|-

1857 births
1938 deaths
People from Woolwich
Royal Navy personnel of the Anglo-Egyptian War
Royal Navy admirals of World War I
British military personnel of the Third Anglo-Ashanti War
Grand Crosses of the Order of the Dannebrog
Knights Commander of the Order of the Bath
Knights Commander of the Order of St Michael and St George
Commanders of the Royal Victorian Order
Commandeurs of the Légion d'honneur
Recipients of the Navy Distinguished Service Medal
Admiral presidents of the Royal Naval College, Greenwich
Military personnel from Kent